

This is a list of the Pennsylvania state historical markers in Columbia County.

This is intended to be a complete list of the official state historical markers placed in Columbia County, Pennsylvania by the Pennsylvania Historical and Museum Commission (PHMC). The locations of the historical markers, as well as the latitude and longitude coordinates as provided by the PHMC's database, are included below when available. There are eight historical markers located in Columbia County.

Historical markers

See also

List of Pennsylvania state historical markers
National Register of Historic Places listings in Columbia County, Pennsylvania

References

External links
Pennsylvania Historical Marker Program
Pennsylvania Historical & Museum Commission

Pennsylvania state historical markers in Columbia County
Columbia County
Tourist attractions in Columbia County, Pennsylvania